is a Japanese anime director. He worked as a storyboarder for the 1998 anime series Outlaw Star.

Filmography

Anime television series
My-HiME (2004)
My-Otome (2005))
My-Otome Zwei (2006))
The Girl Who Leapt Through Space (2009)
Accel World (2012)

Anime films
Accel World: Infinite Burst (2016)

References

External links

Anime directors
Japanese film directors
Living people
Year of birth missing (living people)